Nelson Olveira (born June 19, 1974 in Paso de los Toros, Uruguay) is a Uruguayan footballer who last played for Central Español in the Uruguayan Segunda División. He played as a centre back.

Teams
  Fénix 1992
  Peñarol 1993–2000
  Fénix 2001
  Huracán Buceo 2001
  Alianza Lima 2002-2003
  Gimnasia y Esgrima de La Plata 2003–2004
  San Martín de Porres 2004
  Independiente de Santa Fe 2005–2006
  Peñarol 2006–2007
  Estudiantes de Mérida 2007
  Fénix 2008
  Miramar Misiones 2009–2010
  Boston River 2010–2011
  Central Español 2011–2012

Titles
  Peñarol 1993, 1994, 1995, 1996, 1997 and 1999 (Uruguayan Primera División Championship)
  Central Español 2011/12 (Uruguayan Segunda División Championship)

References
 
 Profile at Tenfield Digital 

1974 births
Living people
People from Paso de los Toros
Uruguayan footballers
Uruguayan expatriate footballers
Centro Atlético Fénix players
Peñarol players
Boston River players
Huracán Buceo players
Central Español players
Miramar Misiones players
Club Alianza Lima footballers
Club Deportivo Universidad de San Martín de Porres players
Independiente Santa Fe footballers
Club de Gimnasia y Esgrima La Plata footballers
Estudiantes de Mérida players
Uruguayan Primera División players
Uruguayan Segunda División players
Categoría Primera A players
Expatriate footballers in Argentina
Expatriate footballers in Colombia
Expatriate footballers in Peru
Expatriate footballers in Venezuela
Association football defenders
Rampla Juniors managers
Boyacá Chicó managers